The  is a limited express train service which runs between  and  in Kyushu, Japan, operated by the Kyushu Railway Company (JR Kyushu).

Service pattern

Rolling stock
Services are formed of 4-car 783 series electric multiple unit (EMU) sets with Green car (first class) accommodation. As of 2022, 787 series and 885 series trains are also used for Midori services to Hakata.

Formations
Services are normally formed of 4- or 8-car 783 series EMU formations as shown below. All cars are no-smoking.

4-car formations

8-car formations

History
The Midori name was first used from 1 October 1961 on limited express services operating between Osaka and Hakata using 12-car KiHa 80 series diesel multiple unit (DMU) sets. Timings were as shown below.

 Down: Osaka 13:40 → Hakata 22:35
 Up: Hakata 07:25 → Osaka 16:20

Although the route was now electrified, services continued to use KiHa 80 series DMU sets formed as 13 cars.

 Down: Shin-Osaka 10:30 → Kumamoto 21:35 / Oita 21:10
 Up: Kumamoto 08:30 / Oita 09:10 → Shin-Osaka 19:35

From 1 October 1965, the services operated between Shin-Osaka and Sasebo and Oita. From 1 October 1967, services were once again modified to run between Shin-Osaka and Oita, this time using new 581 series EMUs. The 581 series units were used for only a year on these services, however, replaced by 11-car 485 series EMU formations from October 1968. 

 Down Midori 1: Osaka → Oita
 Down Midori 2: Okayama → Miyazaki
 Up Midori 1: Oita → Okayama
 Up Midori 2: Miyazaki → Osaka

These services were discontinued from March 1975 following the completion of the Sanyō Shinkansen to Hakata.

Initially 6 return workings daily were operated, increased to 10 daily from October 1980, and further increased to 13 return workings daily from November 1982. From November 1986, the Midori services were rescheduled to operate separately from the Kamome services. Following privatization of Japanese National Railways (JNR), the 485 series EMUs used on Midori services were refurbished between 1990 and 1991, receiving all-over red liveries and "Midori Express" branding. By March 2000, all services were operated with 783 series EMUs.

References

External links

 JR Kyushu Midori information 

Named passenger trains of Japan
Railway services introduced in 1961